The battle of Muroyama was one of many battles of the 12th-century Japanese civil war known as the Genpei War. The Taira forces split into five divisions, each attacking in succession, and wearing down Yukiie's men. Eventually surrounded, the Minamoto were forced to flee.

References

1180s in Japan
1183 in Asia
Muroyama 1183
Muroyama